Tinderbox is a personal content management system and personal knowledge base.

It is a tool for storing, arranging, exploring, and publishing data.

Developer 
Tinderbox was developed for Mac OS and Mac OS X by Mark Bernstein, Chief Engineer of Eastgate Systems.

Features 
Its functions include storing and organizing notes, plans, and ideas, and sharing ideas through blogs.

It also offers functionality similar to that of outliner and spatial hypertext/mind mapping tools, in addition to knowledge management, database and agent (persistent search) tools.

Tinderbox is used for a wide variety of tasks:
 As a personal web publishing system, with good support for blog creation and management 
 Personal information management 
 Outlining and mind mapping
 Concept mapping
 Note-taking
 Plot and story construction and writing
 Creating hypertexts

References

Further reading

 Review by Nathan Matias, SitePoint, 2004 February 27.
 Giles Foden, The Guardian, 2003 October 16.
 Deep Tinderbox, About This Particular Outliner, Ted Goranson
 The Best IA Tool You Never Heard Of, Sean Carton, ClickZ, 2002 October 7.
 Innovation Extreme Makeover, Robert Ouellette, Boxes and Arrows, 2004 June 21.
 Tinderboxing Engelbart Revisited, Gordon Meyer, Wet Behind the Years, 2003 May 29.

External links 
 

Content management systems
Personal information managers
Outliners
Note-taking software
Hypertext